The 1908 Michigan State Normal Normalites football team represented Michigan State Normal College (later renamed Eastern Michigan University) during the 1908 college football season.  In their third and final season under head coach Henry Schulte, the Normalites compiled a record of 1–4 and were outscored by their opponents by a combined total of 40 to 15. Curry Hicks, who served as the school's head football coach in 1910, was the team captain.

In three years as Michigan Normal's football coach, Schulte compiled a 9–6–1 record. He later served as the head football coach at Missouri (1914-1917) and Nebraska (1919-1920).

Schedule

References

Michigan State Normal
Eastern Michigan Eagles football seasons
Michigan State Normal Normalites football